is a district of Shibuya, Tokyo, Japan.

As of November 2020, the population of this district is 3,802.

Geography
Motoyoyogichō borders Hatsudai in the north, Yoyogi to the east, Uehara to the south, and Nishihara to the west.

Demography

Places of interest

Cultural

Temples
 Ōkeiji (應慶寺) (Motoyoyogichō 24–3)

Embassies
 Embassy of Vietnam (Motoyoyogichō 50–11)

Education
 operates public elementary and junior high schools.

All of Motoyoyogicho is zoned to Tomigaya Elementary School (富谷小学校), and Uehara Junior High School (上原中学校).

Nurseries and kindergartens:
Motoyoyogi Nursery (元代々木保育園) (Motoyoyogichō 51–19)
Zion Kindergarten (シオン幼稚園) (Motoyoyogichō 26–1)

References

Neighborhoods of Tokyo
Shibuya